Pavle (Macedonian and) is a Serbian, Macedonian, Croatian and Georgian male given name corresponding to English Paul; the name is of biblical origin (cf. Saint Paul).

People known mononymously as Pavle include:
 Pavle I, Serbian Patriarch (c. 1526–1541), Serbian Orthodox bishop
 Pavle, Serbian Patriarch (1914–2009), Serbian Orthodox Patriarch

People with this name include: 

 Pavle Abramidze (1901–1989), Georgian Soviet general
 Pavle Dešpalj (born 1934), Croatian composer and conductor
 Pavle Đurišić (1909–1945), Montenegrin Serb Chetnik army commander
 Pavle Gregorić (1892–1989), Croatian communist politician
 Pavle Ingorokva (1893–1983), Georgian historian
 Pavle Ivić (1924–1999), Serbian linguist
 Pavle "Paja" Jovanović (1859–1957), Serbian painter
 Pavle Jurina (1954–2011), Croatian handball player
 Pavle Kalinić (born 1959), Croatian politician and writer
 Pavle Karađorđević (1893–1976), Prince regent of Yugoslavia
 Pavle Nenadović (1703–1768), Serbian Orthodox bishop
 Pavle Orlović, 14th-century Serbian nobleman
 Pavle Papić (1919–2005), Croatian mathematician
 Pavle Popović (1868–1939), Serbian literary critic and historian
 Pavle Radenović (1391–1415), Bosnian nobleman
 Pavle Radić (1880–1928), Croatian politician
 Pavle Savić (1909–1994), Serbian physicist and chemist
 Pavle Simić (1818–1876), Serbian painter
 Pavle Vuisić (1926–1988), Yugoslav actor

See also
Paulus (disambiguation)
Pavao (given name)
Pavo (given name)
Paja (given name)
Pajo (given name)
Pavel, another Slavic form of the name

Serbian masculine given names
Macedonian masculine given names
Georgian masculine given names
Croatian masculine given names